The 2006 Japanese Formula 3 Championship was the 27th edition of the Japanese Formula 3 Championship. It began on 1 April at Fuji and ended on 22 October at Motegi. German driver Adrian Sutil took the championship title, winning five from eighteen races.

Teams and drivers
 All teams were Japanese-registered. All cars were powered by Bridgestone tyres.

Race calendar and results

Standings
Points are awarded as follows:

References

External links
 Official Site 

Formula Three
Japanese Formula 3 Championship seasons
Japan
Japanese Formula 3